Tai Long may refer to:
 Tai Long language
 Tai Long Village aka. Tai Long Tsuen, the oldest and largest village in the Tai Long Wan (Sai Kung District) area
 Tai Long, Chi Ma Wan, a village near Tai Long Wan, on Chi Ma Wan Peninsula
 Tai Long Wan (disambiguation)
 Wo Hang Tai Long, a village in Sha Tau Kok, North District, Hong Kong